Sylvia Margaret Gore  (25 November 1944 – 9 September 2016) was an English football player and coach. She scored the England women's national football team's first goal in its first official match, a 3–2 win over Scotland in Greenock in 1972, and was involved in women's football for 60 years.

Biography

Early life 
Gore was born in Prescot, Lancashire, and raised in the north-west of England. She attended Our Ladies’ Junior School and St Edmund Arrowsmith Secondary School.

Gore's father and uncle both played football for Prescot Cables and encouraged her to take up the game. The headteacher of her school vetoed any participation in the school team but she joined Manchester Corinthians in her early teens. With Corinthians, Gore played in charity matches all over the world at a time when the Football Association (FA) had banned female players from its pitches. She said:

Playing and coaching career 
In 1972, Gore paid around £2,000 to progress through a series of trials for the first England team. She was accepted onto the team and made history by scoring the team's first goal in its first match on 18 November 1972.

Gore was in the Fodens team, originally a works team from the Edwin Foden, Sons & Co. lorry manufacturing plant in Sandbach, which defeated Southampton in the 1974 final of the Women's FA Cup. Gore recalled:

Gore was known as the Denis Law of women's football and once netted 134 goals in a season. After Gore stopped playing at the age of 35, she managed the Wales women's national football team from 1982 to 1989. She also worked as a football development officer for Knowsley council.

Later life 
Gore was a member of the FA women's committee for 20 years, and in 1999 she won a special achievement award at the inaugural FA Women's Football Awards. In 2014, she became the first female director at the Liverpool County Football Association.  In the 2000 New Year Honours, Gore was made an MBE for services to girls' and women's football. She was inducted into the National Football Museum Hall of Fame in 2014. In March 2016, Gore became an ambassador for the club Manchester City Women.

Gore died of cancer on 9 September 2016 aged 71.

References

Bibliography

 

1944 births
2016 deaths
English Football Hall of Fame inductees
English women's football managers
English women's footballers
England women's international footballers
Members of the Order of the British Empire
Deaths from cancer in England
Sportspeople from Prescot
Sportspeople from Lancashire
Women's association football midfielders
Fodens Ladies F.C. players